Künzler is a Swiss surname. Notable people with the surname include:

Alexander Künzler (born 1962), German boxer
Jakob Künzler (1871-1949), Swiss witness of the Armenian Genocide
Laura Künzler (born 1996), Swiss volleyball player
Mathis Künzler (born 1978), Swiss actor

Surnames of Swiss origin